Kattakurgan District is a district of Samarqand Region in Uzbekistan. The capital lies at the town Payshanba.

The district consists of 8 urban-type settlements (Payshanba, Suv hovuzi, Mundiyon, Polvontepa, Qoradaryo, Vayrat, Yangiqoʻrgʻoncha, Kattaming) and 11 rural communities.

References 

Samarqand Region
Districts of Uzbekistan